Dakota Wint is an American documentary filmmaker, vlogger, podcast host, and spiritual teacher from Detroit, Michigan. His films and podcasts revolve around current events, strange spirituality, and taboo traditions. His YouTube channel, Dakota of Earth, has been viewed over 40 million times as of August 2021.

In June 2021 he released a documentary, Aghori: Holy Men of The Dead about a group of Hindu cannibals from India, called the Aghori, who do post mortem rituals as a pathway to enlightenment. His podcast, A Place for Humans is consistently charting on Apple Podcast top 100 for spirituality category and has featured guests such as Baba Ram Dass, Tommy Chong, Alex Grey, Duncan Trussell and Kat Graham. Dakota has traveled to several countries, including India, Peru, Turkey, Egypt, Jamaica, Mexico,  and many more, documenting what he has experienced during his travels with his audience.

References

American documentary filmmakers
American podcasters
Living people
People from Detroit
Spiritual teachers
Year of birth missing (living people)